Hydrelia speciosa is a moth in the family Geometridae first described by Hiroshi Inoue in 1992. It is found in Nepal.

References

Moths described in 1992
Asthenini
Moths of Asia